Pterostylis montana is a species of greenhood orchid endemic to New Zealand. Flowering plants have erect, linear leaves on the flowering stem with a single green flower with translucent white stripes and an unusual twisted labellum.

Description
Pterostylis montana is a terrestrial, perennial, deciduous, herb with an underground tuber and which often grows in small colonies. The dorsal sepal and petals are fused, forming a hood or "galea" over the column. The lateral sepals are more or less erect, spread apart from each other with short, narrow tips projecting slightly above the galea with a broad V-shaped sinus between them and a wide gap between them and the galea. The labellum is reddish-green, darker near its tip, flattened with a central ridge and its tip is twisted to one side. Flowering occurs from September to December.

Taxonomy and naming
Pterostylis montana was first formally described in 1949 by Edwin Hatch and the description was published in Transactions and Proceedings of the Royal Society of New Zealand. The specific epithet (montana) is a Latin word meaning "of mountains", referring to the habitat of this species.

Distribution and habitat
This greenhood grows in a wide range of habitats from dense forests to peat bogs on the North, South and Chatham Islands.

Conservation
Pterostylis montana is classed as "not threatened".

References

montana
Orchids of New Zealand
Plants described in 1949